Tawag ng Tanghalan Kids was an amateur singing competition currently aired as a segment of the noontime show It's Showtime from March 13 to June 10, 2017. Dubbed as "Your all time favorite search for outstanding amateur talents", the competition is open to Filipino child contenders from Metro Manila, Luzon, Visayas, and Mindanao. This is the only kids season for Tawag ng Tanghalan Franchise.

Tawag ng Tanghalan Kids was the next season intended for young contenders ages 7 to 13 years. Auditions started on December 4, 2016 and on March 13, 2017, following the conclusion of the Tawag ng Tanghalan on March 11, 2017 held at Resorts World Manila. Its grand finale was held on June 10, 2017.

Jhon Clyd Talili of Mindanao emerged as the grand champion for the kids edition that spanned for three months. Keifer Sanchez was declared runner-up, Mackie Empuerto finished as third place, Sheena Belarmino emerged as fourth place, and Francis Concepcion finished at fifth place.

However, after an impromptu sing-off on a show went viral; Sanchez, Empuerto and Concepcion became international sensations and hugely popular trio collectively known as TNT Boys.

Hosts and judges
Yeng Constantino served as the head judge for the kids season, with Louie Ocampo, Jaya, Ogie Alcasid, serving as fill-in for Constantino. Judges Billy Crawford, Karylle, Karla Estrada, K Brosas, Nyoy Volante, Mitoy Yonting, Erik Santos, and Kyla returned as judges for the kids season. Both Jed Madela and Jolina Magdangal were added as new judges.

Vhong Navarro, Anne Curtis, Amy Perez-Castillo, and Vice Ganda served as hosts for the kids season, with Ryan Bang, Jhong Hilario, Teddy Corpuz, and Jugs Jugueta serving as co-hosts. James Reid and Nadine Lustre also served as co-hosts.

Angel Locsin and Robi Domingo served as guest hosts in the absence of the main hosts.

Prizes 
The winner as the Kids Grand Champion of Tawag ng Tanghalan will receive negosyo package from Siomai House, a house and lot from Camella and a trophy plus ₱1,000,000 from Topps. The 2nd placer will receive ₱200,000, the 3rd placer will receive ₱100,000 and the 4th and 5th placers will receive ₱50,000.

Resbak 
The resbakers took place on May 27 to June 3, 2017.

Results Details:

 Contestant advanced to the next round and last round to Resbak
 Contestant advanced to the semi-finals
 Contestant was eliminated

May 27, 2017

May 29, 2017

May 30, 2017

May 31, 2017

June 1, 2017

June 2, 2017

Final (June 3, 2017)

Semifinals 
The semi-finals took place on June 5 to June 9, 2017.

Results Details:

 Contestant advanced to the next round
 Contestant advanced to the Grand Finals
 Contestant was eliminated

Round 1 (June 5–6, 2017)

Round 2 (June 7–8, 2017)

Round 3 (June 9, 2017)

Grand Finals 
The grand finals took place on June 10, 2017 held at ABS-CBN Studio 3 instead of large venues.

Results Details

Jhon Clyd Talil from Mindanao emerged as the winner, followed by Kiefer Sanchez as the runner-up, Mackie Empuerto placing third, Sheena Belarmino fourth. Francis Concepcion coming fifth.

Elimination table 
Color Key:

Results Details

References

External links
 Tawag ng Tanghalan Kids

Tawag ng Tanghalan seasons
2017 Philippine television seasons